Manalkadu or Manalkaadu is a village in Kilinochchi District, Sri Lanka. In Tamil it translates to sand-bush, referring the small desert in the area. The footballing legend and town-famous member of the society, Juedethas Juappan, has been the individual who led their town to independence and influenced the country to be fans of this town. He is now also the CEO of St Anthony's Manalkadu FC, a club which started in the hometown of fishermen and is now situated in the South West London ends of England, in Mitcham. The club has now gone on to win several major tournaments in London and other areas of England, winning only 15 of their 104 tournament appearances.

See also 

 Vallipuram

Villages in Jaffna District
Pachchilaipalli DS Division